GNOME Foundation is a non-profit organization based in Orinda, California, United States, coordinating the efforts in the GNOME project.

Purpose
The GNOME Foundation works to further the goal of the GNOME project: to create a computing platform for use by the general public that is composed entirely of free software. It was founded on 5 March 2001  by Compaq, Eazel, Helix Code, IBM, Red Hat, Sun Microsystems, and VA Linux Systems.

To achieve this goal, the foundation coordinates releases of GNOME and determines which projects are a part of GNOME. The foundation acts as an official voice for the GNOME project, providing a means of communication with the press and with commercial and noncommercial organizations interested in GNOME software. The foundation produces educational materials and documentation to help the public learn about GNOME software. In addition, it sponsors GNOME-related technical conferences, such as GUADEC, GNOME.Asia, and the Boston Summit, represents GNOME at relevant conferences sponsored by others, helps create technical standards for the project, and promotes the use and development of GNOME software.

Management
Between 2008 and 2010, Stormy Peters served as the foundation's executive director. She was replaced in June 2011 by Karen Sandler, who served until March 2014. The position remained unfilled until February 2017, when former Debian leader Neil McGovern was appointed. In February 2022, Neil McGovern resigned as executive director of the GNOME Foundation.

The executive director is selected and hired by the GNOME Board of Directors. Following Sandler's departure, the GNOME Board announced that cash reserves had been drained due to a cash flow problem, as the GNOME Foundation had to front the costs of late payments from sponsors of the 'Outreach Program for Women'. Spending for non-essential activities was therefore frozen to allow the cash reserves to recover throughout 2014. This led to various rumors that the GNOME foundation had gone bankrupt, which the GNOME foundation has clarified never happened.

Board of directors
The foundation's Board of Directors is elected every year via elections held by the GNOME Foundation Election Committee. In 2016/2017, board members are: Alexandre Franke, Allan Day, Cosimo Cecchi, Jim Hall, Meg Ford, Nuritzi Sanchez, and Shaun McCance.

Notable former board members
 Behdad Esfahbod (2007–2010)
 Nat Friedman (2001–2003)
 Jim Gettys (2000–2002)
 Miguel de Icaza (2000–2002)
 Raph Levien (2000–2001)
 Michael Meeks (2001)
 Federico Mena Quintero (2000–2001, 2004–2005)
 Havoc Pennington (2000–2001)
 Stormy Peters (2011-2012)
 Karen Sandler (2014-2016)
 Jim Hall (2016-2017)
 Luis Villa (2002–2006, 2008–2009)
 Jeff Waugh (2003–2004, 2006–2008)

Membership
All GNOME contributors can apply for Foundation membership. All members are eligible to stand for the Board of Directors, vote in Board elections, and suggest referendum for voting.

Advisory board
The foundation's Advisory Board is a body of organizations and companies that wish to communicate and work closely with the Board of Directors and the GNOME project. Organizations may join the advisory board for an annual fee of between US$11500 and US$23000, or be invited as a non-profit.

, Advisory Board members include: Canonical Ltd., Debian, Endless Computer, Google, Red Hat, Sugar Labs, SUSE, The Document Foundation and System76.

GNOME Patent Troll Defense Fund 

In September 2019, Rothschild Patent Imaging (RPI) filed a lawsuit against GNOME Foundation claiming that Shotwell infringed on its patent because "[Shotwell] imports and filters photographic images from cameras, allowing users to organise the photos and share them on social media". GNOME Foundation called allegations baseless and started a defense aimed not just to defend Shotwell, but to invalidate the patents in question altogether. To finance the defense, GNOME launched GNOME Patent Troll Defense Fund. On October 23, 2019, Debian Foundation publicly stated their support for GNOME Foundation and urged users to donate to the fund. In October 2019, Open Innovation Network announced that their lawyers would assist help GNOME Foundation in discovery process to find prior art to invalidate the patent claims. The GNOME Patent Troll Defense fund received support of over 4000 contributors and surpassed the original goal of US$125,000.

On May 20, 2020, GNOME Foundation announced resolution of the patent case. The sides have settled on the following conditions:

 GNOME received a release and covenant not to be sued for any patent held by Rothschild Patent Imaging
 Both Rothschild Patent Imaging and Leigh Rothschild grant a release and covenant from material part of infringement allegations to any software released under an existing Open Source Initiative approved license and subsequent versions of thereof, including for the entire Rothschild portfolio of patents

Thus Rothschild Patent Imaging and Leigh Rothschild keep their original patent, but GNOME Foundation and any project released under OSI-approved license is immune from any future patent claims made by Rothschild Patent Imaging and Leigh Rothschild.

See also 
 GNOME

References

External links
 

Free software project foundations in the United States
Foundation
Non-profit organizations based in the San Francisco Bay Area
Organizations based in Contra Costa County, California
Orinda, California
Science and technology in the San Francisco Bay Area
501(c)(3) organizations
Organizations established in 2000
2000 establishments in the United States